The Swedish National Financial Management Authority is a central administrative government agency in Sweden responsible for economic financial management, analyses and economic forecasting for central government agencies.  The entity operates under the Ministry of Finance.  The agency consists of seven departments:
 Performance and Financial Management
 Effective Administrative Support
 Accounting Principles and Internal Auditing
 Central Government Accounting
 Analysis and Forecasts
 Coordination of IT System Hermes
 Audit of EU structural funds

Purpose
The main purpose of the agency is to economically organize government spending and obtain savings.

Operational concept
The agency's financial management is committed to ensuring:

 Effective controls in central government finances
 Resource allocation in accordance with political priorities
 High levels of productivity and efficiency
 Being government's expert in performance and financial management
 Being responsible for good accounting practices in central government
 Possessing unique knowledge of central government finances
 Offering cost-efficient administrative support systems
 Working at all levels in central government
 Working in close cooperation with the government offices and agencies
 Working internationally
 Monitoring external developments continuously and to participate in major networks
 Expertise in all aspects of financial management
 Having a comprehensive overview of the financial management field

See also
Private
List of Swedish companies
Stockholm Stock Exchange
Government
Government finance
Central bank ("Sveriges Riksbank")
Currency ("krona", "kronor" in plural)
List of Swedish government enterprises
Monetary policy of Sweden
Ministry of Finance
Swedish National Institute of Economic Research
Spending
Social security in Sweden
Agencies, unions
Government agencies in Sweden
Confederation of Swedish Enterprise (Svenskt Näringsliv)
Swedish Confederation of Professional Associations (SACO)
Swedish Confederation of Professional Employees (TCO)
Swedish Trade Union Confederation (LO)
Energy policy
Nuclear power in Sweden
Proposed Oil phase-out in Sweden

Other links
 Economy of Europe
 European Union
 History of copper currency in Sweden

References

External links
 The Swedish National Financial Management Authority

Institute of Economic Research
Economy of Sweden
Economic research institutes
Public finance of Sweden
Financial management organizations